John Bayly  was Dean of Lismore  from 1828 until 1831.

He was educated at Trinity College, Dublin.  He was Chaplain to Henry Paget, 1st Marquess of Anglesey. He served as Dean of Killaloe from 1808 to 1828, when he was appointed Dean of Lismore.

He died on 24 June 1831.

References

Alumni of Trinity College Dublin
Deans of Lismore
1731 deaths
Year of birth unknown